Barry Joseph Collier  (born 5 December 1949) is an Australian politician. He was a Labor Party member of the New South Wales Legislative Assembly from 1999 to 2011 and from 2013 to 2015, representing the electorate of Miranda. Collier retired at the 2011 election, but contested and won a 2013 by-election when his successor, Liberal Graham Annesley, resigned. Collier then retired a second time at the 2015 election. In September 2016, Collier was elected to Sutherland Shire Council, serving as a Councillor representing B Ward.

He was awarded the Medal of the Order of Australia (OAM) in the 2017 Australia Day Honours List for services to the Parliament of New South Wales, to the law and to education.

Education and legal careers
From 1973 to 1989, Collier was a high school economics teacher with the NSW Education Department. During his teaching career, Collier also served as NSW economics curriculum consultant and chairman of the NSW Higher School Certificate Economics Examination Committee. He wrote three textbooks and accompanying workbooks for high school students in Years 11 and 12 entitled Introducing Economics, published by Jacaranda-Wiley.

From 1989 to 1999, he practiced criminal law as a solicitor with both the Office of the Director of Public Prosecutions and the Legal Aid Commission of NSW, and later as a barrister in private practice. As a Legal Aid solicitor, Collier appeared in the 1993 ABC Television reality local court documentary So Help Me God.

Political career
Collier was elected to the New South Wales Legislative Assembly in the 1999 NSW state election defeating Deputy Leader of the Liberal Party, Hon Ron Phillips who had held the seat of Miranda for 15 years.'From 2007 until his retirement from Parliament in 2011, he served as Parliamentary Secretary Assisting the Attorney General & Minister for Justice, Assisting the Minister for Corrective Services, Assisting the Treasurer and Assisting the Minister for Ports & Waterways.

Collier made over 700 speeches in the NSW Legislative Assembly.

Collier is notable for switching from the right faction to the left faction in 2005 and causing the Government to back down on a proposal to resurrect the long-standing plan to build the Southern Freeway (or F6) through his electorate. He returned to the right faction of the Labor Party in September 2008.

On 21 September 2010 Collier announced that he would not contest the 2011 state election. He gave his valedictory speech in the Legislative Assembly on 26 November 2010. In 2013, Collier nominated to contest Miranda once again in the by-election triggered by the resignation of his successor, Graham Annesley and won a surprise victory, returning to Parliament on the back of a 27 per cent swing- the largest swing ever recorded at a New South Wales by-election 

In Opposition, Collier served as Shadow Minister for Water and as Shadow Minister for Sport and Recreation 

Collier announced he again would not recontest Miranda at the 2015 election, which will mark his second retirement from the New South Wales Parliament.

Collier decided to run for Sutherland Shire Council in September 2016 and became a councillor for B Ward with Labor gaining a 20 percent swing on the primary vote  He did not seek re-election in 2021.

Political hiatus and personal life
After temporarily leaving politics, Collier returned to legal practice as a barrister.

In September 2012, Collier was appointed by the NSW Government as a trustee of the newly created Rookwood General Cemetery Reserve Trust Board. He resigned from the Board in September 2013 to contest the Miranda by-election.

Collier is married with two children and has lived in Sutherland Shire since 1972.

Literature
Collier has written and published several poems including "Millennium Drought" for which he won the National Henry Lawson Literary Society Award for Free Verse in 2017 and "Anzac Day 2018: Let Us Also Remember."

In November 2018, Barry Collier published his political memoir, Collier For Miranda: The 1999 Labor Campaign. The book details his successful grassroots campaign as an unknown, first-time Labor candidate to win the southern Sydney seat which had been held by the Liberal Party for 15 years.

External links
Parliament profile

References

 

1949 births
Australian barristers
Australian Labor Party members of the Parliament of New South Wales
Australian schoolteachers
Australian solicitors
Australian textbook writers
Criminal defense lawyers
Economics educators
Members of the New South Wales Legislative Assembly
Living people
People from the Sutherland Shire
20th-century Australian lawyers
20th-century Australian politicians
21st-century Australian lawyers
21st-century Australian politicians
Recipients of the Medal of the Order of Australia